83rd NYFCC Awards
January 3, 2018

Best Picture: 
Lady Bird

The 83rd New York Film Critics Circle Awards, honoring the best in film for 2017, were announced on November 30, 2017 and presented on January 3, 2018.

The ceremony was dedicated to the memory of American film historian, journalist, author, filmmaker, screenwriter, documentarian, and film and literary critic Richard Schickel, who died on February 18, 2017.

Winners

Best Film:
Lady Bird
Best Director:
Sean Baker – The Florida Project
Best Actor:
Timothée Chalamet – Call Me by Your Name
Best Actress:
Saoirse Ronan – Lady Bird
Best Supporting Actor:
Willem Dafoe – The Florida Project
Best Supporting Actress:
Tiffany Haddish – Girls Trip
Best Screenplay:
Paul Thomas Anderson – Phantom Thread
Best Animated Film:
Coco
Best Cinematography:
Rachel Morrison – Mudbound
Best Non-Fiction Film:
Faces Places
Best Foreign Language Film:
BPM (Beats per Minute) • France
Best First Film:
Jordan Peele – Get Out
Special Award:
Molly Haskell

References

External links
 2017 Awards

New York Film Critics Circle Awards
New York
2017 in American cinema
New
2017 in New York City